In Canadian politics, a Quebec lieutenant is a Quebec politician who is selected by the party leader to be his or her main advisor and/or spokesperson on issues specific to Quebec. This is particularly the case when the leader is an anglophone, though several francophone leaders have also had Quebec lieutenants; all francophone leaders of the Liberal Party have had Quebec lieutenants. It is typically filled by a Member of Parliament or at least a current or former candidate for Parliament. The position is usually a well-known but often an unofficial assignment, and has no official legal status.

Notable Quebec lieutenants
Some past and current Quebec lieutenants include:

Liberal

Conservative (1867–1942)

Progressive Conservative

Reform

Canadian Alliance

Conservative (2004–present)

Social Credit

New Democratic

Notes

References

Canadian political phrases
Quebec political phrases
Political terminology in Canada
Political bosses

Federal political office-holders in Canada